Eyal Benvenisti (born 1959) is an attorney and legal academic, and Whewell Professor of International Law at the University of Cambridge. He was formerly Anny and Paul Yanowicz Professor of Human Rights at Tel Aviv University's Faculty of Law. Since 2003 he has been part of the Global Law Faculty at New York University School of Law. He is the founding co-editor of Theoretical Inquiries in Law (1997–2002), where he served as Editor in Chief (2003-2006). He has also served on the editorial boards of the American Journal of International Law, and International Law in Domestic Courts.

Early life and education
Benvenisti was born in Israel in 1959, the son of Meron Benvenisti.  He earned his LL.B. (1984) at Hebrew University of Jerusalem. He went to the United States for graduate work, where he received a Master's in Law (LL.M.) (1988) and J.S.D. (1990), Yale Law School.

Academic career
He returned to Jerusalem, where he started his academic career at the Hebrew University of Jerusalem, specializing in international law.

In addition to teaching and research, he served as Director of the Minerva Center for Human Rights at the Hebrew University (2000–2002). He was Director of the Cegla Center for Interdisciplinary Research of the Law (2002–2005).

He is currently a professor of human rights at Tel Aviv University's Faculty of Law. His areas of teaching and research include international law, constitutional law and administrative law.

He has served as visiting professor of law at Harvard Law School, Columbia Law School, University of Michigan School of Law, University of Pennsylvania Law School, University of Toronto Law School, University of Hamburg Institute of Law & Economics. A Humboldt Fellow at the Humboldt University and the University of Munich and a visiting fellow at the Max Planck Institute for International Law at Heidelberg.

Since 2003 he has been part of the Global Law Faculty, New York University School of Law.

Serves on the Editorial Boards of the American Journal of International Law, and International Law in Domestic Courts. Founding Co-Editor, Theoretical Inquiries in Law (1997–2002, Editor in Chief 2003–2006).

Associate Member, Institut de Droit International (2011).

In 2012 he won the European Research Council Advanced Grant. 

In May 2015, he was elected Whewell Professor of International Law at the University of Cambridge. He took up this appointment in January 2016, and also became Director of the Lauterpacht Centre for International Law.

Publications

Books 
Sharing Transboundary Resources: International Law and Optimal Resource Use.  (Cambridge University Press, 2002).
The International Law of Occupation (Princeton University Press, 1993) (paperback edition with a new preface, 2004) (second edition, forthcoming by Oxford University Press).
Private Property and the Israeli-Palestinian Settlement (The Jerusalem Institute for Israel Studies, 1998, in Hebrew) (co-author: Eyal Zamir).
The Legal Status of Lands Acquired by Israelis before 1948 in the West Bank, Gaza Strip and East Jerusalem (The Jerusalem Institute for Israel Studies, 1993) (in Hebrew) (co-author: Eyal Zamir) .
Legal Dualism: The Absorption of the Occupied Territories into Israel (Westview Press, 1989)

Editor of following books 
Israel and the Palestinian Refugees, (with Chaim Gans and Sari Hanafi, Springer Academic Press, 2006).
The Impact of International Law on International Cooperation  (with Moshe Hirsch, Cambridge University Press, 2004).
Challenges to the Welfare State in an Era of Globalization, (with Georg Nolte, Springer Academic Press, (2003).

Selected articles 
Rethinking the Divide Between Jus ad Bellum and Jus in Bello in Warfare against Non-State Actors, 34 Yale J. Int'l L. 541 (2009).
National Courts, Domestic Democracy, and the Evolution of International Law, 20 Europ. J. Int'l L. 59 (2009) (with George W. Downs).
Court Cooperation, Executive Accountability and Global Governance, NYU J. Int'l L & Policy (2009) (with George W. Downs).

References

External links
 Personal web page at Buchmann Faculty of Law, Tel Aviv University 

1959 births
Living people
Israeli people of Greek-Jewish descent
Israeli legal scholars
University of Michigan staff
Max Planck Institute for Comparative Public Law and International Law people
Whewell Professors of International Law
Members of the Institut de Droit International